The tenth season of The Real Housewives of New Jersey, an American reality television series, aired on Bravo. The season was primarily taped in New Jersey from March 2019 to June 2019, while the reunion was shot in January 2020. It was announced by Bravo on September 25, 2019 and premiered on November 6, with the finale airing on February 26, 2020, ahead of a three-part reunion special in March 2020.

The season focuses on the lives of returning cast members Teresa Giudice, Melissa Gorga, Dolores Catania, Margaret Josephs, Jennifer Aydin and Jackie Goldschneider. Original cast member Danielle Staub once again appears as a friend of the housewives for the third and final time.

Production and crew
Amy Kohn, Dorothy Toran, Jessica Sebastian, Jordana Hochman, Lauren Volonakis, and Andy Cohen are recognized as the series' executive producers; it is produced and distributed by Sirens Media.

Cast and synopsis 

In April 2019, former cast member Caroline Manzo declined an offer to return to the series as a friend of the housewives, calling it "insulting" for producers to offer her a non full-time role. The cast from season nine remained, with Danielle Staub appearing as a friend of the housewives for the third consecutive season.

An after show for the tenth season started streaming online via YouTube on December 11, 2019. It features all six main cast members, Staub, Marty Caffrey, Joe Benigno and Frank Catania giving their commentary about the recent episode.

In January 2020, Staub stated on Watch What Happens Live with Andy Cohen that she would be leaving the series for the second time after the season. In the same month, a reunion special for the tenth season was filmed in New Jersey Performing Arts Center, with Cohen serving as the host.

 During her appearance at the reunion, Staub sits in a separate seat from the left couch, next to Aydin.

Episodes

References

External links
 

2019 American television seasons
2020 American television seasons
New Jersey (season 10)